At least two ships of the Hellenic Navy have borne the name Sfendoni ("Sling"):

  a  launched in 1907 and decommissioned in 1945.
  a  launched in 1942 as USS Aulick transferred to Greece in 1959 and renamed. She was scrapped in 1997.

Hellenic Navy ship names